Silli Lalli is an Indian sitcom that aired on ETV Kannada in early summer of 2003. It was directed by Vijaya Prasad and produced by his Final cut production company. It has aired more than 1500 episodes in 5 years.

Plot 
The series is about Vittal Rao, a doctor, and his family's day-to-day lives. Often one or more of the family members encounters trouble and the family works together to solve it.

Cast 
 Ravishankar Gowda as Dr Vittal Rao – Vittal is the head of the family, but is dominated by his wife Lalitamba. It took him 11 years to complete his M.B.B.S. He does not know which medicine to give and often leaves the patient in a coma or sometimes dead. He is cursed by everyone, yet he is joyful and sings songs like "Nagu Nagutha Nali Nali" as he is the fan of Dr.Rajkumar. His famous line is "I am Dr. Vittal Rao, very famous in surgery and bharjary". His weakness is women. His political girlfriends are Damayanti & ex-mayor Mayuri.
 Manju Bhashini as Samaja Sevaki Lalitamba aka Lalli – She is Vittal's wife and a social worker. Her goal is to become the first woman chief minister of Karnataka. She loses the election. She is always seen cleaning. She is supported by her two assistants Vishalu and Ranganath. She fights with Silli. Her famous line is "Naanu samaja sevaki Lalitamba, nan nambi please please" (I'm the social worker Lalithamba. Believe me, please please). Because of this, her husband calls her Nambi darling. Her political enemies are Damayanti and Mayuri.
 Roopa Prabhakar as Kathalekhaki Sreelatha aka Silli – She is a writer and the doctor's sister. She considers herself to be a great writer; however, no one reads her writing. She hates Lalithamba and due to their fights the family lands in trouble. 
 Prashant as Prahlada aka Palli – He is the doctor's younger brother. He is considered useless by his family because he does nothing except say nonsense. He has a lover called Suji. With her he plays Kuntebille.
 Srinivasa Gowda as Ranganath – He is the assistant of Lalitamba and calls himself a social worker. He and his wife are misers. They depend on their madam to such an extent that they even have their breakfast in their madam's house. He is Vittal's best friend.
 Sunetra Pandit as Vishalu – She is Lalitamba's secretary and Ranganath's wife. She is fat and Ranga often calls her Tata Sumo or Nandi Betta. She has a daughter, Suji, who is deaf. She always supports her madam. often Sunetra says " Chappale" when all family members will be happy.
 Jyothi Arya and Mala (early episodes) as Suji, the daughter of Vishalu and Ranga. She is deaf and always causes trouble. She is engaged to Palli. She is called "jagathina ombattheneya adbutha" by Govinda.
 Namitha Rao as NML- Nurse Maid Lalita – She is Lalli's cook. She is very romantic and joyful. She tries her best to impress Vittal. She always sings, especially when she thinks of the doctor. She is an able cook and a nurse, thus the name NML. She does not like Ranga and Vishalu. Critics say that she is the star of the show and alone steals the show.
Vijayalakshmi as SML (earlier episodes) - Servant Maid Lalitha – She was Lalli's cook. She is very joyful and laughs in a peculiar manner. Doctor likes her.
 Sangamesh Upase Is a K.A.S Officer Of Karnataka Government working as joint commissioner of GST. as well as he is Known For His Govinda Role in Silli lalli tv Show. Govinda is the doctor's assistant, but more clever than him. He is very well mannered and faithful. The doctor owes him 2 years' salary and a bonus and calls him Kothi Govindha. He is given much more respect than the doctor.
 Mithra as Janesha – He is the servant who is a simpleton. He is a polite but uneducated man who is very bad with Math or numbers. To silence him, Dr. Vittal Rao often asks him simple Math questions like "Naakaralli mooru hodareshto? Naakakke aidu seridareshto? (How much is four minus three? How much is four plus five?), to which an agitated Janesha replies, "Ayyo! Lekka maatra kelbedi. Lekkadalli naan swalpa hinde (Please don't ask me Math. I am a bit weak in it)." He calls Govinda as godfather.
Girija Lokesh as Ammu Athe - she is the mother of Samaajsevaki Lalithamba. She often speaks Butler English and is proud of it but is constantly opposed by the family members for doing so.
Balaraj as Murari - He calls himself a great scientist so as to marry Lalitamba. His formulas fail everytime and doctor calls him gujari and wants to get rid of him.
Anand as Narahari - He is Murari's assistant and a better scientist than him. He loves maid NML who calls him Naranari. He often insults Murari for his failed formulas.

Other characters 
 Inspector Suver ke bache(skb) and constable Kalappa - They are the police of Mutthaide Nagara. Their famous dialogue is " hathereke aeroplane main chapathi karega re, ragi rotti nu karega re".
 Chikkodi Chinnaswamy - He is the news reporter of SL TV and hosts a show called 'dideer varthe' and 'dideer sandarshana'.
 Koturappa Simha Reddy - He is a resident of Mutthaide Nagar often criticizing Vittal Rao's family for their nuisance. He is like a split personality, becomes an angry fighter when changes his costume.
 Pooja Lokesh as Damayanti - Doctor's lover
 Marina Tara as Mayuri - Ex-Mayor and Doctor's lover

Colors Kannada original programming
Kannada-language television shows